The Flame Within is Stream of Passion's second studio album released on May 27, 2009, by Napalm Records. It is the follow-up to their debut album, Embrace the Storm.

It is the first album with guitarists Eric Hazebroek and Stephan Schultz and keyboardist Jeffrey Revet, who are replacing three members who departed in 2007, including Stream of Passion's founder and original composer Arjen Anthony Lucassen, who left as he was planning since its creation. It is also the last album with Davy Mickers on drums.

Track listing
"The Art of Loss" - 3:57
"In the End" - 4:01
"Now or Never" - 4:13
"When You Hurt Me the Most" - 4:46
"Run Away" - 4:16
"Games We Play" - 4:02
"This Endless Night" - 4:20
"My Leader" - 4:53
"Burn My Pain" - 4:18
"Let Me In" - 3:32
"Street Spirit" - 5:24 (Radiohead cover)
"A Part of You" - 4:48
"All I Know" - 2:12
"Far and Apart" - 4:12 (Bonus track)

Lineup
Marcela Bovio - Lead Vocals; Violin
Eric Hazebroek - Lead/Rhythm Guitars
Stephan Schultz - Lead/Rhythm Guitars
Johan van Stratum - Bass Guitars
Jeffrey Revet - Keyboards; Piano
Davy Mickers - Drums

With:
Ben Mathot - Violin
Judith Van Driel - Violin
Mark Mulder - Viola
David Faber - Cello

Release history

References

2009 albums
Stream of Passion albums
Napalm Records albums